Neraudia is a genus of plants in family Urticaceae. All five species are endemic to Hawaii. Ma'oloa is a common name for these plants.

Species include:
 Neraudia angulata
 Neraudia melastomifolia, Gaud.
 Neraudia ovata, Gaud.
 Neraudia sericea

References

 
Urticaceae genera
Taxonomy articles created by Polbot